Chuqllu Chuqllu or Chhuxllu Chhuxllu (Quechua chuqllu corncob, spelled chhuxllu in Aymara, the reduplication indicates that there is a group or a complex of something, "a group of corncobs", Hispanicized spelling Chocllochocllo) is a mountain in the Wansu mountain range in the Andes of Peru, about  high. It is situated in the Arequipa Region, Castilla Province, Orcopampa District.

References 

Mountains of Peru
Mountains of Arequipa Region